Alma Youlin (1881-1949) was an American stage singer and actress in the 1900s-1920s. In the 1930s, her career long over, she was living with relatives in Chicago according to the 1940 census.

References

External links

Alma Youlin, IBDb.com
Alma Youlin(University of Louisville, Macauley Theatre collection)
picture postcard for The Edelweiss Restaurant, Chicago ?year unknown
sheet music page eBay
newspaper accounts of Youlin's career 1900-10
newspaper accounts of Youlin's career 1910-20
newspaper accounts 1920-30

1881 births
1949 deaths
20th-century American women singers
20th-century American singers